Lawrence James William "Lawrie" Tierney (4 April 1959 – 6 December 2011) was a Scottish footballer who played as a midfielder. Born in Leith, Tierney started his professional career at Heart of Midlothian in 1976, making 49 league appearances for the club before being released in February 1980. He then had brief spells at Hibernian and Wigan Athletic before moving to the United States, where he played in the Major Indoor Soccer League for Phoenix Inferno, Golden Bay Earthquakes and Tacoma Stars.

References

External links

1959 births
2011 deaths
Scottish footballers
Heart of Midlothian F.C. players
Hibernian F.C. players
Wigan Athletic F.C. players
Scottish Football League players
English Football League players
People from Leith
Phoenix Inferno players
Golden Bay Earthquakes (MISL) players
Tacoma Stars players
Association football midfielders
Footballers from Edinburgh